The  is a fashion event that has been held in Kobe, Japan and other cities during spring and autumn every year since 2002; over 30 brands have participated. It is characteristically a public relations event for consumers, and a chance for young designers to publish their own designs. 

In the second half of the 19th century, there were many trading companies and banks that made inroads into Kobe, and the comparatively wealthy families who worked for these companies, tended to live on the mountain side of Kobe and Ashiya.  Originally the Kobe fashion-style was seen in children of such wealthy families. The fashion-style was characterized by the refined everyday wear which in quiet colors (navy blue, black, white and gray), in contrast to the popular style for girls in Osaka. From around 1990, many Japanese women's magazines came to take up this style, because it is known to look refined and cute by women in their teens and early 20s. A magazine named Kobe Style focuses on the style trends of Kobe. 

The mode of "Kobe-Style" has somewhat changed, although it is expressed as a pronoun of a conservative fashion in Japan currently, it has been popular among young Japanese girls.

And Kobe collection will hold in Second Life, an Internet-based virtual world developed by Linden Research, Inc (commonly referred to as Linden Lab).

Sponsors (2002 - 2007) 
 American Express
 Asahi Breweries
 Asahi Kasei
 Coca-Cola
 Daimaru
 Häagen-Dazs
 JJ (magazine)
 Kirin Brewery Company
 Kodansha
 Mainichi Broadcasting System
 Namco Bandai
 Nissan Motors
 Shiseido
 Thailand
 Tokyo Broadcasting System
 Toshiba
 VISA Japan
 UCC Ueshima Coffee Co.
 Wacoal

References

External links 
 

Kobe
Fashion events in Japan
Japanese fashion
Japanese subcultures
Recurring events established in 2002
2002 establishments in Japan
Annual events in Japan